The Apostolic Nunciature to Lithuania is an ecclesiastical office of the Catholic Church in Lithuania. It is a diplomatic post of the Holy See, whose representative is called the Apostolic Nuncio with the rank of an ambassador.

Representatives of the Holy See
Apostolic delegates to the Baltic States
Edward O'Rourke (8 December 1920 – December 1921)
Antonino Zecchini (20 October 1922 – 7 December 1925)
Apostolic internuncios
Lorenzo Schioppa (10 March 1927  – 30 April 1928)
Riccardo Bartoloni (30 April 1928 – 9 April 1933)
He supported the local clergy's struggle to protect the independence of the lay Catholic organization Catholic Action from government control. For this he was declared persona non grata and expelled from the country in the summer of 1931.
Apostolic nuncios
Luigi Centoz (19 February 1940 – 24 August 1940)
Justo Mullor García (30 November 1991 – 2 April 1997)
Erwin Josef Ender (9 July 1997 – 19 May 2001)
Peter Stephan Zurbriggen (25 October 2001 – 14 January 2009)
Luigi Bonazzi (14 March 2009 – 18 December 2013)
Pedro López Quintana (8 March 2014 – 4 March 2019)
Petar Rajič (15 June 2019 – present)

See also
Foreign relations of the Holy See
List of diplomatic missions of the Holy See

References

Lithuania
 
Holy See–Lithuania relations